HMCS Miramichi was a  that served in the Royal Canadian Navy during the Second World War. She remained on the west coast of Canada for the entirety of the war. She was named for Miramichi, New Brunswick. After the war she was purchased with the intent of conversion for mercantile use. However, that never took place and instead, she was scrapped in 1949.

Design and description
They came in two versions powered by different engines; those with a diesel engines and those with vertical triple-expansion steam engines. Miramichi was of the latter design and was larger than her diesel-engined cousins. She had a complement of 6 officers and 77 enlisted.

Miramichi had two vertical triple-expansion steam engines, each driving one shaft, using steam provided by two Admiralty three-drum boilers.

Miramichi was armed with a single quick-firing (QF) /40 caliber Mk IV gun mounted forward. For anti-aircraft purposes, the minesweeper was equipped with one QF 2-pounder Mark VIII and two single-mounted QF 20 mm Oerlikon guns. As a convoy escort, Miramichi was deployed with 40 depth charges.

Service history
Miramichi was ordered on 23 February 1940 as part of the 1939–1940 construction programme. The minesweeper's keel was laid down by Burrard Dry Dock Co. Ltd. at Vancouver, British Columbia and the ship was launched on 2 September 1941. She was commissioned into the Royal Canadian Navy on 26 November 1941 at Vancouver.After commissioning, Miramichi spent the entire war alternating between service with Esquimalt Force and Prince Rupert Force as a minesweeping and patrol vessel. In the summer and fall of 1943, she was occasionally used as a training vessel. She was paid off 24 October 1945 at Esquimalt.

Following the war Miramichi was sold to the Union Steamship Co. of British Columbia in 1946. She was to be converted to a merchant vessel though that was never begun and instead the ship was sold for scrap and broken up at Vancouver in 1949–1950. The city of Miramichi possesses the vessel's bell, which is on display at city hall. The community received the naval bell, following naval tradition in the case of decommissioned Canadian ships named for towns and cities. The Canadian Forces Base Esquimalt Naval and Military Museum naval bell archive includes baptism information from HMCS Miramichi.

See also
 List of ships of the Canadian Navy

References

Notes

Citations

Sources

External links
 HMCS Miramichi at ReadyAyeReady.com

1941 ships
Bangor-class minesweepers of the Royal Canadian Navy
Ships built in British Columbia
World War II minesweepers of Canada